Robert Kaennorasing is a Thai Muay Thai fighter who is a former three weights Rajadamnern Stadium champion and Isuzu Cup winner during the Muay Thai golden era.

Biography & career
Robert was born in a small village to the city of Khon Kaen in the province of Isan. In his village he started Muay Thai when he was 12 years old with his younger brother Rolex at the Kaennorasing camp, alongside other future champions such as Wanwiset and Wanpichit Kaennorasing. Fighting under the name "Adisak Kaennorasing" Robert had around 70 fights for the Kaennorasing camp before moving to Jocky gym in Bangkok at the age of 15.

After his retirement, Robert became a trainer at Jocky gym which later became Skarbowsky gym.

Titles & honours
Rajadamnern Stadium
 1989 Rajadamnern Stadium super flyweight (105 lbs) champion
 1991 Rajadamnern Stadium featherweight (126 lbs) champion (5 defenses)
 1993 Rajadamnern Stadium super featherweight (130 lbs) champion (1 defense)
Isuzu Cup
 1991 Isuzu Cup tournament winner
Sports Writers Association of Thailand
 1992 fight of the year (vs Namkabuan Nongkeepahuyuth)
 2000 fight of the year (vs Jean-Charles Skarbowsky)

Fight record

|-  bgcolor="#fbb"
| 2004-08-28 || Loss ||align=left| Shane Chapman || Philip Lam Promotion || Wellington, New Zealand || Decision || 5 || 3:00 

|-  bgcolor="#fbb"
| 2003- || Loss||align=left| Liu Hailong ||  || Guangzhou, China || Decision || 5 || 3:00

|- bgcolor="#cfc"
| 2001-06-03 || Win ||align=left| Melchor Menor|| Warriors Cup 3 || Burbank, California, USA || Decision (Unanimous) ||5 || 3:00

|-  bgcolor="#cfc"
| 2000-12-05 || Win ||align=left| Jean-Charles Skarbowsky || King's Birthday || Bangkok, Thailand || Decision || 5 || 3:00
|-  bgcolor="#fbb"
| 2000-06-08 || Loss ||align=left| Jean-Charles Skarbowsky || Muay Thai in Las Vegas, The Venetian || Las Vegas, NV || KO (Left uppercut) || 1 || 2:23 
|-
! style=background:white colspan=9 |

|-  bgcolor="#cfc"
| 2000-02-13 || Win ||align=left| Takeshi Oshiro || Kakidamashi presents KASSHIN || Japan || TKO (Referee Stoppage)|| 2 || 2:18

|-  style="background:#fbb;"
| 1997-04-12 || Loss ||align=left| Suwitlek Sor Sakowarat || Omnoi Stadium || Samut Sakhon, Thailand || Decision  || 5 || 3:00
|-  style="background:#cfc;"
| 1997-02-18 || Win ||align=left| Tappaya Sit-Or || Channel 7 Stadium || Bangkok, Thailand || Decision  || 5 || 3:00
|-  style="background:#cfc;"
| 1996-10-27 || Win ||align=left| Tappaya Sit-Or ||Channel 7 Stadium   || Bangkok, Thailand || Decision  || 5 || 3:00 
|-  style="background:#cfc;"
| 1996-03-06 || Win ||align=left| Pairot Wor.Wolapon || Rajadamnern Stadium || Bangkok, Thailand || Decision  || 5 || 3:00
|-
|-  style="background:#cfc;"
| 1995-06-14 || Win ||align=left| Panmongkol Carryboy || Rajadamnern Stadium || Bangkok, Thailand || Decision  || 5 || 3:00
|-  style="background:#cfc;"
| 1995-05-11 || Win ||align=left| Tepparit Por Tawatchai || Rajadamnern Stadium || Bangkok, Thailand || Decision  || 5 || 3:00
|-  style="background:#fbb;"
| 1994-06-18 || Loss||align=left| Jongsanan Fairtex || Lumpinee Stadium || Bangkok, Thailand || KO ||  ||
|- style="background:#fbb;"
| 1994-05-03 || Loss ||align=left| Namkabuan Nongkeepahuyuth || Lumpinee Stadium || Bangkok, Thailand  || Decision || 5 || 3:00
|-  style="background:#fbb;"
| 1993-11-29 || Loss ||align=left| Therdkiat Sitthepitak || Rajadamnern Stadium || Bangkok, Thailand || Decision  || 5 || 3:00
|-  style="background:#cfc;"
| 1993-11-10 || Win ||align=left| Jongrak Lukprabat || Rajadamnern Stadium || Bangkok, Thailand || Decision  || 5 || 3:00 
|-
! style=background:white colspan=9 |
|-  style="background:#c5d2ea;"
| 1993-10-06 || Draw ||align=left| Jongrak Lukprabat || Rajadamnern Stadium || Bangkok, Thailand || Decision  || 5 || 3:00 
|-
! style=background:white colspan=9 |
|-  bgcolor="#cfc"
| 1993-08-08 || Win ||align=left| Gilbert Ballantine ||  || Shang Zen, China || Decision || 5 || 3:00
|-  style="background:#cfc;"
| 1993-07-21 || Win ||align=left| Jongrak Lukprabat || Rajadamnern Stadium || Bangkok, Thailand || Decision  || 5 || 3:00 
|-
! style=background:white colspan=9 |
|-  style="background:#fbb;"
| 1993-06-09 || Loss ||align=left| Komphet Lukprabat || Rajadamnern Stadium || Bangkok, Thailand || Decision  || 5 || 3:00

|-  style="background:#fbb;"
| 1993-02-26 || Loss ||align=left| Therdkiat Sitthepitak || Lumpinee Stadium || Bangkok, Thailand || Decision  || 5 || 3:00
|- style="background:#cfc;"
| 1992-12-23 || Win ||align=left| Namkabuan Nongkeepahuyuth || Rajadamnern Stadium || Bangkok, Thailand  || Decision || 5 || 3:00
|-  style="background:#cfc;"
| 1992-11-16 || Win ||align=left| Buakaw Por.Pisichet || Rajadamnern Stadium || Bangkok, Thailand || Decision  || 5 || 3:00 
|-
! style=background:white colspan=9 |
|-  style="background:#cfc;"
| 1992-09-18 || Win||align=left| Pepsi Biyapan || Rajadamnern Stadium || Bangkok, Thailand || Decision  || 5 || 3:00
|-  style="background:#cfc;"
| 1992- || Win ||align=left| Jack Kiatniwat || Rajadamnern Stadium || Bangkok, Thailand || Decision  || 5 || 3:00 
|-
! style=background:white colspan=9 |
|-  style="background:#cfc;"
| 1992-04- || Win ||align=left| Komphet Lukprabat || Rajadamnern Stadium || Bangkok, Thailand || Decision  || 5 || 3:00
|-  style="background:#cfc;"
| 1992-03-25 || Win ||align=left| Rajasak Sor.Vorapin || Rajadamnern Stadium || Bangkok, Thailand || Decision  || 5 || 3:00 
|-
! style=background:white colspan=9 |
|-  style="background:#fbb;"
| 1992-02- || Loss ||align=left| Komphet Lukprabat || Rajadamnern Stadium || Bangkok, Thailand || Decision  || 5 || 3:00
|-  style="background:#cfc;"
| 1992-01-29 || Win ||align=left| Padejsuk Kiatsamran || Rajadamnern Stadium || Bangkok, Thailand || KO|| 2 ||  
|-
! style=background:white colspan=9 |
|-  style="background:#cfc;"
| 1991-11-25 || Win ||align=left| Taweechai Wor.Preecha|| Rajadamnern Stadium || Bangkok, Thailand || Decision  || 5 || 3:00 
|-
! style=background:white colspan=9 |
|-  style="background:#cfc;"
| 1991-10-23 || Win ||align=left| Neungsiam Kiatwichian || || Bangkok, Thailand || Decision || 5 || 3:00

|-  style="background:#cfc;"
| 1991-09- || Win ||align=left| Rajasak Sor.Vorapin || Rajadamnern Stadium || Bangkok, Thailand || Decision || 5 || 3:00
|-  style="background:#cfc;"
| 1991-07-24 || Win ||align=left| Padejsuk Kiatsamran || Rajadamnern Stadium || Bangkok, Thailand || Decision || 5 || 3:00
|-  style="background:#fbb;"
| 1991-06-19 || Loss ||align=left| Rajasak Sor.Vorapin || Rajadamnern Stadium || Bangkok, Thailand || Decision  || 5 || 3:00
|-  style="background:#cfc;"
| 1991-05-22 || Win ||align=left| Chanalert Muanghadyai || Rajadamnern Stadium || Bangkok, Thailand || Decision  || 5 || 3:00
|-  style="background:#cfc;"
| 1991-04-19 || Win ||align=left| Prabpram Sitsantad || Rajadamnern Stadium || Bangkok, Thailand || Decision  || 5 || 3:00
|- style="background:#cfc;"
| 1991-03-09 || Win ||align=left| Yodkhunpon Sittraiphum || Samrong Stadium - Isuzu Cup Tournament Final ||  Samut Prakan, Thailand  || Decision || 5 || 3:00
|-
! style=background:white colspan=9 |
|- style="background:#cfc;"
| 1991-01-12 || Win ||align=left| Chatchainoi Chaoraiaoi || Samrong Stadium - Isuzu Cup Tournament Semi Final ||  Samut Prakan, Thailand  || Decision || 5 || 3:00
|- style="background:#cfc;"
| 1990-09-23 || Win ||align=left| Prakardseuk Kiatmuangtrang || Samrong Stadium - Isuzu Cup Tournament ||  Samut Prakan, Thailand  || Decision || 5 || 3:00
|-  style="background:#cfc;"
| 1990-05-23 || Win ||align=left|  ||  || Hat Yai, Thailand || Decision ||5 ||3:00
|-  style="background:#fbb;"
| 1990-02-01 || Loss ||align=left| Supernoi Sor Tallingchan || Rajadamnern Stadium || Bangkok, Thailand || KO || 1 ||
|-  style="background:#cfc;"
| 1989-11-13 || Win ||align=left| Khamron Sor.Vorapin || Rajadamnern Stadium || Bangkok, Thailand || Decision  || 5 || 3:00
|-  style="background:#cfc;"
| 1989-09-27 || Win ||align=left| Songkram Por Pao-in || Rajadamnern Stadium || Bangkok, Thailand || Decision  || 5 || 3:00 
|-
! style=background:white colspan=9 |
|-  style="background:#cfc;"
| 1989-07-08 || Win ||align=left| Lakhin Wassandasit || Rajadamnern Stadium || Bangkok, Thailand || Decision  || 5 || 3:00
|-  style="background:#cfc;"
| 1989-04-27 || Win ||align=left| Dangsanan Sitdanchai || Rajadamnern Stadium || Bangkok, Thailand || Decision  || 5 || 3:00
|-  style="background:#fbb;"
| 1989-03-30 || Loss ||align=left| Choochai Kiatchansing || Rajadamnern Stadium || Bangkok, Thailand || Decision  || 5 || 3:00
|-  style="background:#cfc;"
| 1989-02-22 || Win ||align=left| Choochai Kiatchansing || Rajadamnern Stadium || Bangkok, Thailand || Decision  || 5 || 3:00
|-  style="background:#cfc;"
| 1989-01-15 || Win ||align=left| Lakhin Wassandasit || Crocodile Farm || Samut Prakan, Thailand || Decision  || 5 || 3:00
|-  style="background:#fbb;"
| 1988- || Loss ||align=left| Manachai Sor.Ploenchit|| Samrong Stadium || Samut Prakan, Thailand || Decision  || 5 || 3:00
|-  style="background:#c5d2ea;"
| 1988- || Draw ||align=left| Rungrit Sor Rachan || Samrong Stadium || Samut Prakan, Thailand || Decision  || 5 || 3:00
|-  style="background:#c5d2ea;"
| 1988- || Draw ||align=left| Rittidet Sor.Ploenchit || Samrong Stadium || Samut Prakan, Thailand || Decision  || 5 || 3:00
|-  style="background:#cfc;"
| 1988- || Win ||align=left| Manasak Or Pleukdaeng || Samrong Stadium || Samut Prakan, Thailand || Decision  || 5 || 3:00
|-  style="background:#cfc;"
| 1988- || Win ||align=left| Manasak Or Pleukdaeng || Samrong Stadium || Samut Prakan, Thailand || Decision  || 5 || 3:00
|-  style="background:#cfc;"
| 1988- || Win ||align=left| Wichanoi Sor Rachan || Samrong Stadium || Samut Prakan, Thailand || Decision  || 5 || 3:00 
|-
| colspan=9 | Legend:

References

Living people
1968 births
Robert Kaennorasing
Robert Kaennorasing